Skateboard is a 1978 American sports drama film directed by George Gage and starring Allen Garfield and Leif Garrett. Tony Alva features in a cameo as "Tony Bluetile".

Overview

Manny Bloom, a Hollywood agent, finds himself in debt to Sol, a powerful bookie. To make a fast buck, he creates a team of exceptionally talented skateboarders and enters them in a downhill race. If they win, they will get $20,000.

Cast
Allen Garfield - Manny Bloom
Kathleen Lloyd - Millicent Broderick
Leif Garrett - Brad Harris
Tony Alva - Tony Bluetile
Ellen O'Neal - Jenny Bradshaw
Richard Van der Wyk - Jason Maddox
Steve Monahan - Peter Steffens
David Hyde - Dennis
Pam Kenneally - Randi
Antony Carbone - Sol
Gordon Jump - Mr. Harris
Pat Hitchcock - Mrs. Harris
Orson Bean - Himself

References

External links

1978 films
1970s sports drama films
American sports drama films
Films scored by Mark Snow
Skateboarding films
1978 drama films
1970s English-language films
1970s American films